Zara Rutherford (born 5 July 2002) is a Belgian-British aviator. At age 19, she became the youngest female pilot to fly solo around the world and the first person to complete a circumnavigation in a microlight aircraft after a five-month journey which began in Kortrijk, Belgium, on 18 August 2021, and ended on 20 January 2022.

Early life
Zara Rutherford was born in Brussels, Belgium, to British professional pilot Sam Rutherford and Belgian recreational pilot and lawyer Beatrice de Smet. As a young girl, Rutherford would accompany her father, sometimes flying part of the way herself. At the age of 14, she began training to become a pilot and gained her pilot's license in 2020. She completed her A levels in Mathematics, Further Mathematics, Economics and Physics at St. Swithun's School, a girls' school in Winchester, Hampshire, England.

Solo flight around the world 

On 26 July 2021, at a press conference at Popham Airfield near Winchester, Rutherford announced her bid to become the youngest female pilot to fly solo around the world, at the age of 19. She aimed to break the record previously set by American pilot Shaesta Waiz, who achieved the record in 2017 at the age of 30. Aside from this record, she also attempted to break two other records—to become the first woman to circumnavigate the world in a microlight aircraft and the first Belgian to circumnavigate the world solo in a single-engine aircraft. The record-breaking attempt was also meant to raise awareness about the gender gap in fields like science, technology, engineering and mathematics (STEM) and aviation, and to inspire more women and girls to be involved in STEM fields early. Her attempt was supported by main sponsor ICDSoft, a Bulgarian web hosting service, Richard Branson's Virgin Group, Belgian start-up SafeSky, and Dutch staffing and recruitment company TMC Group. She also partnered with charities Girls Who Code and Dreams Soar, which aim to inspire and help women and girls to enter into STEM fields.
 
Rutherford began her solo attempt from Kortrijk-Wevelgem Airport in Belgium on 18 August 2021 aboard a Shark UL aircraft, which was loaned to her by the Slovakian manufacturer Shark.Aero. From Kortrijk, she flew to Popham Airfield where she spent an hour before flying to Wick in Scotland via Aberdeen. The following day, she landed in Reykjavík, Iceland, after a five-hour flight.

After starting her journey, Rutherford made stops in Greenland, Canada, the East Coast of the United States, The Bahamas, Turks and Caicos, British Virgin Islands, Colombia, Panama, Costa Rica, Mexico, the West Coast of the United States, and the US state of Alaska. After arriving in Nome, Alaska, on 30 September 2021, she was forced to wait a week for her Russian visa to be renewed. By the time her passport arrived back from the Russian consulate in Houston, Texas, the weather had turned bad and she had to wait another three weeks before she could cross the Bering Strait, time spent in part carrying out maintenance. On 1 November 2021, she finally reached Anadyr, Russia—the halfway point of her journey. From Anadyr, she flew to Magadan on the following day, and on 9 November, she stopped at Ayan—a town with only 800 people, none of whom spoke English, and which had no Wi-Fi service—where she was stuck again due to a winter storm. She finally reached Khabarovsk on 30 November and Vladivostok on 2 December.

After flying from Russia on 11 December 2021, Rutherford intended to make stops in China, but because of the country's strict COVID-19 restrictions she was forced to make a detour over the Sea of Japan and fly to South Korea instead. During the six-hour flight, she had difficulty contacting air traffic controllers in Seoul and she sought the help of a KLM commercial pilot who forwarded her messages to air traffic control and helped her find the correct frequencies. She landed in Gimpo on the same day. On 13 December, she departed for a stop at Muan before flying the following day to Taipei, Taiwan. On 16 December, Rutherford landed in Clark, Pampanga, in the Philippines. She intended to make a second stop in Dumaguete but had to fly the following day to Kota Kinabalu, Malaysia, so as to avoid the approaching Typhoon Rai.

From Kota Kinabalu, she made stops in Ketapang and Jakarta in Indonesia and Seletar in Singapore. After Banda Aceh, she made stops in Colombo, Sri Lanka, and Coimbatore, India. After stopping for the New Year in Mumbai, Rutherford began 2022 with stops in Al Ain in the United Arab Emirates and in Riyadh and Tabuk in Saudi Arabia where she was welcomed by Saudi prince and former pilot and astronaut Sultan bin Salman Al Saud. After a stop in Alexandria, Egypt, on 8 January 2022, she arrived at Heraklion on the Greek island of Crete for another stop.

Rutherford made stops in Sofia, Bulgaria, on 14 January 2022; in Senica, Slovakia; and in Benešov, Czech Republic, on 16 January. She landed at Frankfurt Egelsbach Airport, Germany, on 19 January. Arriving in Kortrijk, Belgium, on 20 January 2022, she completed a circumnavigation of the world and landed at the same airport from which she began the trip. Zara is a member of the Experimental Aircraft Association Chapter 838 in Racine, Wisconsin.

After the solo flight 

On 23 March 2022, Zara's younger brother, Mack Rutherford at the age of 16, began his own round-the-world trip in an ultralight aircraft. Zara's brother became the youngest person to fly around the world five months later when he arrived as his starting point of Sofia on 24 August to break the Guinness World record previously held by compatriot Travis Ludlow.

In June 2022, Deutz AG presented Rutherford with the 2022 Nicolaus August Otto Award.

On 12 September 2022, the Honourable Company of Air Pilots announced that Rutherford had been awarded the Master's Medal. 

Rutherford started her undergraduate studies at Stanford University in September 2022.

See also 
 List of circumnavigations
 List of women aviators
 Mack Rutherford⁣ – the youngest person to fly solo around the world.

References

External links
 

2002 births
Belgian aviation record holders
Belgian people of British descent
Belgian women aviators
British people of Belgian descent
British women aviation record holders
Circumnavigators of the globe
English aviators
Living people
People educated at St Swithun's School, Winchester
People from Brussels